The Norwegian Minister of Navy and Postal Affairs was the head of the Norwegian Ministry of Navy and Postal Affairs. The position existed from 1815 to 1885, but was named Minister of the Navy and Postal Affairs only from 1861.

In 1861, the Ministry of Postal Affairs had been merged with the Ministry of the Navy. The Ministry of the Navy and Postal Affairs was regarded the direct successor. Before this, various other names were used.

List of Norwegian Ministers of Navy and Postal Affairs
In 1815, the ministry was named the 7th Ministry.

References
Ministry of the Navy and Postal Affairs. Councillor of State 1815 - 1885

Navy and Postal Affairs
Naval ministers
1815 establishments in Norway